Lee Kwang-hyun (born 17 August 1993) is a South Korean fencer. He won the gold medal in the men's team foil event at the 2018 Asian Games held in Jakarta, Indonesia.

In 2017, he competed in fencing at the Summer Universiade held in Taipei, Taiwan. He competed in the men's individual foil and men's team foil events.

References

External links 
 

Living people
1993 births
Place of birth missing (living people)
South Korean male foil fencers
Fencers at the 2010 Summer Youth Olympics
Asian Games medalists in fencing
Asian Games gold medalists for South Korea
Fencers at the 2018 Asian Games
Medalists at the 2018 Asian Games
Competitors at the 2017 Summer Universiade
Fencers at the 2020 Summer Olympics
Olympic fencers of South Korea
20th-century South Korean people
21st-century South Korean people